Robert Bean may refer to:

 Robert S. Bean (1854–1931), American judge, Chief Justice of the Oregon Supreme Court
 Robert Bean (politician) (1935–1987), British Labour Party politician and polytechnic lecturer
 Robert Bean (gridiron football) (born 1978), American player of Canadian football
 Robert Bean (artist), Canadian artist, writer and teacher
 Robert Bennett Bean (1874–1944), American professor of anatomy and ethnologist